Ghoria is a genus of moths in the family Erebidae.

Species
 Ghoria albocinerea Moore, 1878
 Ghoria collitoides Butler, 1885
 Ghoria dirhabdus Rothschild, 1916
 Ghoria gigantea (Oberthür, 1879)
 Ghoria nigripars (Walker, 1856)
 Ghoria subpurpurea (Matsumura, 1927)
 Ghoria tecta (Wileman, 1910)

See also
 Ghauri / Ghori

References
 Ghoria at Markku Savela's Lepidoptera and Some Other Life Forms
 Natural History Museum Lepidoptera generic names catalog

Lithosiina
Moth genera